The 2022–23 season is the 141st season in the existence of FC Girondins de Bordeaux and the club's first season back in the second division of French football since 1991. In addition to the domestic league, Bordeaux are participating in this season's edition of the Coupe de France.

Players

First-team squad

Out on loan

Transfers

In

Out

Pre-season and friendlies

Competitions

Overall record

Ligue 2

League table

Results summary

Results by round

Matches 
The league fixtures were announced on 17 June 2022.

Coupe de France

References 

FC Girondins de Bordeaux seasons
Bordeaux